The Yamaha SY99 is a synthesiser combining frequency modulation synthesis (branded as Advanced FM) and sample-based synthesis (branded as Advanced Wave Memory 2) and the direct successor to Yamaha's SY77/TG77. Compared to the SY77, it has a larger keyboard at 76 keys instead of 61, a larger ROM with more in-built AWM samples, the ability to load user-specified AWM samples into on-board RAM, an upgraded effects processor (based upon the Yamaha SPX900 rather than the SPX50 or SPX90), and several other enhanced features.

Specifications
 Date produced: 1991
 Polyphony: 16 notes ("Elements") of AFM + 16 notes (Elements") of sample-playback (AWM2)
 Voice Architecture: Each voice can have up to 2 AFM (6-operator) Elements polyphonically, or 4 AFM (6-op) Elements monophonically, plus up to 2 AWM Elements 
 Filter: 2 multi-stage, time-variant, with resonance and self-oscillation per Element
 Sequencer: 16 tracks, ~27,000 note capacity, 99 patterns, up to 10 songs (cf. the SY77's single song only and ~16,000 notes)
 Effects: 2 internal digital effects processors with 63 types of effects, derived from Yamaha's popular rack-mounted processor, SPX900
 Keyboard: 76 notes with velocity and channel aftertouch, which can be zoned along with pitch-bend to affect only specific keys (unlike on the SY77)
 Memory: 128 preset patches and 128 user patches, 16 preset multi-patch setups (up to 16 voices each) and 16 user multi-patches, 512kB of RAM as standard for user-loaded AWM samples or MIDI data recording from/to connected devices
 Expandability: 5 rear-mounted slots for SYEMB05 memory modules of 512kB each, up to a total of 3MB RAM with standard hardware. The final firmware revision, v1.57, supports up to 8MB of total RAM, a capacity that so far has only been reached by Musitronics' now-discontinued 5 MB upgrade board coupled with the full complement of 5 SYEMB05 modules (2.5MB) and standard RAM (0.5MB).
 Control: MIDI in, out, and thru; pitch wheel; 2 modulation wheels; enhanced functions as a master keyboard when compared to the SY77, etc.

Demo song
"99 flavors", an instrumental song by Chick Corea from his Beneath the Mask album, is named after the SY99; the sequenced version was included on an accompanying floppy disk as a factory demo song.

Notable users
 Brian Eno 
 Chick Corea
 Front 242 
 Jean Ven Robert Hal
 Patrice Rushen
 Toto
 Vangelis
 Thomas Darnal
 Pochonbo Electronic Ensemble

References

Further reading

External links
 Yamaha Sy99 Advanced Audio Demonstration
 Yamaha SY99 | Vintage Synth Explorer
 Yamaha SY99 Music Synthesizer F.A.Q.
 Yamaha SY99 Operating manual

SY99
Music workstations
Polyphonic synthesizers
Digital synthesizers